Radio Kupres or Kupreški Radio is a Bosnian local public radio station, broadcasting from Kupres, Bosnia and Herzegovina.

Estimated number of potential listeners is around 184,416.

Radio Kupres was launched in 1997. Program is mainly produced in Croatian. This radio station broadcasts a variety of programs such as music, local news and talk shows. Due to the favorable geographical position in Canton 10 region, this radio station is also available in neighboring Croatia.

Frequencies
The program is currently broadcast on 4 frequencies:

 Gornji Vakuf  
 Kupres 
 Travnik 
 Ivovik/Borova glava

See also 
List of radio stations in Bosnia and Herzegovina

References

External links 
 www.kupreskiradio.com
 Communications Regulatory Agency of Bosnia and Herzegovina

Kupres
Radio stations established in 1997